Wayward Sisters or wayward sister may refer to:

 The Three Witches from William Shakespeare's play Macbeth
 "Wayward Sisters", a 2018 U.S. TV episode of the 13th season of Supernatural
 Wayward Sisters (TV series), a cancelled spin-off TV series of Supernatural
 "Wayward Sister" (song), an aria from the opera Dido and Aeneas, by Henry Purcell; see List of compositions by Henry Purcell

See also

 Sister (disambiguation)
Weird Sisters (disambiguation)
Wayward (comics)
Wayward (film)
Wayward (novel)
Hunter: The Reckoning – Wayward